Natália Fondrková (born 28 May 1997) is a Slovak Field hockey player who plays as a midfielder and has appeared for Slovakia women's national field hockey team. She previously played for Czech club HC Praga 1946 but currently is playing for Slovak team KPH Rača Bratislava. She was part of Slovak squad which played in EuroHockey Junior Championship U21 A- division in Prague 2015, EuroHockey Indoor Championship II (W) 2014, 2018 Croatia Indoor Cup (W),  2018 EuroHockey Indoor Championship III (W), 2019 Croatia Indoor Cup (W), EuroHockey Championship III (Women) 2019, EuroHockey Indoor Championship III 2020 (W) in Bratislava. With total 38 caps played and 22 international goals scored.

References

External links 
 
 

1997 births
Living people
Sportspeople from Bratislava
Slovak field hockey players